Tabatchnick is a soup manufacturer based in Somerset, New Jersey, USA. It was founded by Louis Tabatchnick of Newark, New Jersey. He started a chain of restaurants in 1895, followed by the company in 1905.

See also 
 List of food companies

References

External links
Tabatchnick Fine Foods official website
Website for Team Blitz Breakfast

Brand name soups
Manufacturing companies established in 1905
Companies based in Somerset County, New Jersey
Jewish American cuisine
Food manufacturers of the United States
1905 establishments in New Jersey